The Tree of Wooden Clogs is a 1978 Italian film written and directed by Ermanno Olmi. The film concerns Lombard peasant life in a cascina (farmhouse) of the late 19th century. It has some similarities with the earlier Italian neorealist movement, in that it focuses on the lives of the poor, and the parts were played by real farmers and locals, rather than professional actors.

It won fourteen awards including the Palme d'or at Cannes and the César Award for Best Foreign Film. The original version of the movie is spoken in Lombard (the Bergamasque variety, an Eastern Lombard dialect).

Plot

Four peasant families working farms for the same landlord scrape out a meagre existence in 1898 in the countryside around Bergamo. Over the course of a year, children are born, crops planted, animals slaughtered, and couples married; stories and prayers are exchanged in the families' shared farmhouse. Undercurrents of revolution are seen by the peasants but largely ignored, as a communist rabble-rouser gives a speech at a local fair and when a newlywed couple visit the big city of Milan and witness the arrest of political prisoners. When spring comes, the father from one of the four families cuts down a tree to make wooden clogs (an alder, aimed in the title because its wood was typically used for this kind of handwork) that his son can walk to school, but the landowner discovers this, and the family is forced off their land by the incensed landlord. The remaining families watch them go, praying for them and recognising their own fragile existence.

Cast
 Luigi Ornaghi - Batistì
 Francesca Moriggi - Batistina
 Omar Brignoli - Minec
 Antonio Ferrari - Tuni
 Teresa Brescianini - Widow Runk
 Giuseppe Brignoli - Anselmo
 Carlo Rota - Peppino
 Pasqualina Brolis - Teresina
 Massimo Fratus - Pierino
 Francesca Villa - Annetta
 Maria Grazia Caroli - Bettina
 Battista Trevaini - Il Finard
 Giuseppina Langalelli - La Moglie Finarda
 Lorenzo Pedroni - Il nonno Finard
 Felice Cervi - Uslì

Critical acclaim
British film-maker Mike Leigh praised the film in The Daily Telegraph'''s 'Film makers on film' interview series, on 19 October 2002. Leigh pays tribute to the film’s humanity, realism, and vast scale. He called the film “extraordinary on a number of levels”, before concluding “this guy [Olmi] is a genius, and that's all there is to it”. Leigh has described Olmi's epic of peasant life in Lombardy as the ultimate location film: " Directly, objectively, yet compassionately, it puts on the screen the great, hard, real adventure of living and surviving from day to day, and from year to year, the experience of ordinary people everywhere...the camera is always in exactly the right place...but the big question, arising out of these truthful and utterly convincing performances achieved by non-actors, always remains: how does he really do it?" When Al Pacino was asked by the AFI what his favourite movie was, he admitted that he "always liked The Tree Of Wooden Clogs." Gene Siskel loved the movie and put it on his list of the 10 Best Films of 1980.

In 2003, The New York Times placed the film on its Best 1000 Movies Ever'' list.

References

External links
 
 
 
 
 The Tree of Wooden Clogs: The Sacredness of Life as Understatement an essay by Deborah Young at the Criterion Collection

1978 films
1978 drama films
Italian drama films
1970s Italian-language films
Films directed by Ermanno Olmi
Palme d'Or winners
Best Foreign Film César Award winners
Films set in 1898
Films set in Lombardy
Films set in Milan
1970s Italian films
Films shot in Lombardy